Richard George Myers (born 6 July 1950) is a former New Zealand rugby union player. A loose forward, Myers played for Leamington RFC in Cambridge and is the only All Black to have played for the club. He represented Manawatu and Waikato at a provincial level, and was a member of the New Zealand national side, the All Blacks, in 1977 and 1978. He played five matches for the All Blacks including one international. On his test debut for New Zealand he played at Number 8 against the Wallabies where his opposite number Greg Cornelsen scored 4 tries in a 30–16 victory for Australia.

References

1950 births
Living people
Rugby union players from Hamilton, New Zealand
New Zealand rugby union players
New Zealand international rugby union players
Massey University alumni
Manawatu rugby union players
Waikato rugby union players
Rugby union flankers
Rugby union number eights
People educated at Cambridge High School, New Zealand